Oleg Chuzhda (Ukrainian: Олег Чужда; born May 8, 1985 in Canet d'en Berenguer) is a Ukrainian former professional road racing cyclist. He is the son of fellow cyclist Oleg Petrovich Chuzhda.

Major results

2005
 2nd Overall Vuelta a Segovia
1st stage 3
2008
 1st Overall Vuelta a la Comunidad de Madrid
2009
 1st Stage 8 Volta a Portugal
2010
 1st Stage 1 Volta a Portugal
 7th Overall Boucles de la Mayenne
 8th Overall Volta ao Alentejo
2011
 2nd National Time Trial Championships
 6th National Road Race Championships
2012
 5th National Time Trial Championships
 6th Overall Vuelta Ciclista a León

References

1985 births
Living people
Ukrainian male cyclists